The 2008 Gold Coast Titans season was the 2nd in the club's history. They competed in the NRL's 2008 Telstra Premiership coached by John Cartwright and co-captained by Luke Bailey and Scott Prince. After 10 rounds of the premiership the Titans found themselves leading the competition with 7 wins from 9 games before slumping to finish the regular season 13th (out of 16) and failing to make the finals. Preston Campbell was awarded the Paul Broughton Medal for the club's player of the year.

Summary

Milestones
Round 1: Four players made their debuts for the club; Jordan Atkins, Aaron Cannings, Ashley Harrison and Ben Jeffery. Jordan Atkins also made his NRL debut.
Round 1: Jordan Atkins broke the club record for most tries scored by an individual in a single match.
Round 2: Nathan Friend scored his 1st career try.
Round 4: Daniel Conn scored his 1st career try.
Round 7: Brenton Bowen made his debut for the club, after previously playing for the North Queensland Cowboys.
Round 10: Shannon Walker made his debut for the club and his debut in the NRL.
Round 12: Esikeli Tonga made his debut for the club and his debut in the NRL.
Round 12: Brett Delaney played his 50th career game.
Round 13: Brad Davis made his debut for the club and his debut in the NRL.
Round 15: Mat Rogers played his 150th career game.
Round 16: Will Matthews made his debut for the club and his debut in the NRL.
Round 17: Brenton Bowen and Luke O'Dwyer played their 50th career game.
Round 18: Michael Henderson played his 50th career game.
Round 18: Two players made their debuts for the club; Matthew Cross and Jordan Rapana. Jordan Rapana also made his NRL debut and scored his 1st career try.
Round 21: Preston Campbell played his 200th career game.
Round 22: Jordan Rankin made his debut for the club and his debut in the NRL.
Round 23: Michael Hodgson played his 150th career game and Esikeli Tonga scored his 1st career try.
Round 26: Two players made their debuts for the club; Selasi Berdie and Billy Ngawini. Selasi Berdie also made his NRL debut.

Squad list

Squad movement

Gains

Losses

Re-signings

Ladder

Fixtures

Regular season

Statistics

Source: NRL 2008 - Gold Coast Titans Summary

Representative honours
The following players played a representative match in 2008.

Australian Kangaroos
Anthony Laffranchi
Scott Prince

Mate Ma'a Tonga
Esikeli Tonga

NSW Blues
Anthony Laffranchi

NSW City Origin
Brett Delaney
Mark Minichiello

NSW Country Origin
Anthony Laffranchi

Queensland Maroons
Ashley Harrison
Scott Prince

Toa Samoa
Smith Samau

References

Gold Coast Titans seasons
Gold Coast Titans season